The 2009 ASP World Tour is a professional competitive surfing league run by the Association of Surfing Professionals. Men and Women compete in separate tours with Events taking place from late February to mid-December, at various surfing locations around the world.

Surfers receive points for their best events. The surfer with the most points at the end of the tour is announced the 2009 ASP surfing world champion.

Men's World Tour

Tournaments
(*) denotes wildcard surfer
Source

Final standings
 Source

Women's World Tour

Tournaments
Source

(*) denotes wildcard surfer

Final standings
Source

External links
 Official Site

World Surf League
ASP World Tour